Jacques Ekomié (born 19 August 2003) is a Gabonese professional footballer who plays as a defender for  club Bordeaux.

Career 
He made his professional debut for the club in a 3–0 Coupe de France loss to Brest on 2 January 2022.

Personal life 
Jacques's father Jean-Jacques is a professor.

References 

2003 births
Living people
Gabonese footballers
French footballers
French sportspeople of Gabonese descent
Black French sportspeople
Association football defenders
FC Girondins de Bordeaux players
Championnat National 3 players
Ligue 2 players